Camilo Sebastián Mayada Mesa (born 8 January 1991) is a Uruguayan professional footballer who plays as a full-back and midfielder for Primera División Paraguaya club Libertad.

Club career
A youth academy graduate of Danubio, Mayada made his professional debut on 4 October 2009 in a 4–2 win against Cerro. He scored his first goal on 16 September 2012 in a 4–2 loss against Montevideo Wanderers.

In July 2021, Mayada was announced as a new Libertad player, agreeing to a 3-year deal.

International career
As a youth international, Mayada has represented Uruguay at 2011 South American U-20 Championship and 2011 FIFA U-20 World Cup.

Mayada made his senior team debut on 5 September 2014 in a friendly match against Japan. He came on as an 83rd-minute substitute for Martín Cáceres as Uruguay defeated Japan 2–0.

Career statistics

International

Honours

River Plate
Recopa Sudamericana: 2015, 2019
Copa Libertadores: 2015, 2018

References

1991 births
Living people
Uruguayan footballers
Uruguayan expatriate footballers
Uruguay under-20 international footballers
Uruguay international footballers
Uruguayan Primera División players
Argentine Primera División players
Liga MX players
Danubio F.C. players
Club Atlético River Plate footballers
Atlético San Luis footballers
Expatriate footballers in Argentina
Expatriate footballers in Mexico
Uruguayan expatriate sportspeople in Argentina
People from Canelones Department
Association football midfielders